Polar fleece is a soft napped insulating fabric made from  polyester.

Uses
Polar fleece is used in jackets, hats, sweaters, sweatpants, cloth diapers (nappies), gym clothes, hoodies, pajamas, blankets, and high-performance outdoor clothing. The produced fleece can be used to create clothes that are very light, soft, and easy to wash. Polar fleece can stretch more easily in one direction than in others.

History
Polar fleece originated in Massachusetts in 1979 when Malden Mills (now Polartec LLC), and Patagonia developed Synchilla (synthetic chinchilla). It was a new, light, strong pile fabric meant to mimic, and in some ways surpass, wool. Malden Mills CEO Aaron Feuerstein intentionally declined to patent polar fleece, allowing the material to be produced cheaply and widely by many vendors, leading to the material's quick and wide acceptance.  Malden Mills registered PolarFleece as a trademark with the United States Patent and Trademark Office on October 6, 1981.

Characteristics
A lightweight, warm and soft fabric, fleece has some of wool's good qualities. Fleece is categorised by weight – in gsm, or grams per square metre. Polar fleece garments traditionally come in different thicknesses: micro, 100, 200, and 300, with 300 being the thickest. 

It is hydrophobic, holding less than 1% of its weight in water. It retains much of its insulating quality even when wet. It is machine washable and dries quickly. It is a good alternative to wool for those who are allergic or sensitive to wool. It can also be made out of recycled polyethylene terephthalate (PET) bottles, or even recycled fleece. 

Regular polar fleece is not windproof and does not absorb moisture (although this is often seen as a benefit, per above). Fleece readily generates static electricity, which causes the accumulation of lint, dust, and pet hair. It is also susceptible to damage from high temperature washing, tumble drying, or ironing under unusual conditions. Lower-quality polyester fleece material is also prone to pilling.

Microfiber pollution
Washing synthetic textiles like fleece releases microfibers, a type of microplastic. The release of these microfibers into the wastewater is proportional to the microplastic pollution in soil, marine, and freshwater habitats. Studies also show that tumble drying of polyester releases airborne microplastics.

References

External links
Polartec, once Malden Mills, the original manufacturer of Polartec and Polarfleece

American inventions
Pile fabrics
Technical fabrics
1990s fashion